Chrysanthos (Greek: Χρύσανθος), original surname Manoleas (Greek: Μανωλέας), (25 February 1768 – 10 September 1834) was Ecumenical Patriarch of Constantinople during the period 1824-1826.

He was a Slavophone Greek and was born on 25 February 1768 in the village Dolno Gramatikovo, now known as Kato Grammatiko. He descended from the Manoleas family, whose descendants still live today. He served as metropolitan bishop of Caesarea, Veria and, from 1811, of Serres, position he held when he was elected Patriarch of Constantinople on 9 July 1824, after the deposition of his predecessor, Anthimus III.

He was a member of the Filiki Eteria. He was educated, but also arrogant, and he made many enemies. He was accused of having an affair with Evfimia, widow of the traitor Asimakis, and for this reason he was deposed by the Turks on 26 September 1826 and was exiled to Kayseri. He died on 10 September 1834 and was buried in the Monastery of Christ the Saviour in the island of Prinkipos, where he resided for the last years of his life.

Sources 
 Οικουμενικό Πατριαρχείο
 Χαμχούγιας, Χρήστος, Ο Οικουμενικός Πατριάρχης Κωνσταντινουπόλεως Γρηγόριος ΣΤ' ο Φουρτουνιάδης εν μέσω εθνικών και εθνοφυλετικών ανταγωνισμών, διδακτορική διατριβή, Αριστοτέλειο Πανεπιστήμιο Θεσσαλονίκης (ΑΠΘ), Θεολογική Σχολή, Τμήμα Ποιμαντικής και Κοινωνικής Θεολογίας, 2006

References 

1768 births
1834 deaths
People from Edessa, Greece (municipality)
Greek people of Bulgarian descent
19th-century Ecumenical Patriarchs of Constantinople
Members of the Filiki Eteria